The Furggelenstock (1,656 m) is a mountain of the Swiss Prealps, located west of Oberiberg in the canton of Schwyz. It lies on the range surrounding Alpthal.

References

External links
Furggelenstock on Hikr

Mountains of the Alps
Mountains of the canton of Schwyz
Mountains of Switzerland